Telex is a research anti-censorship system that would allow users to circumvent a censor without alerting the censor to the act of circumvention. It is not ready for real users, but a proof-of-concept mock system exists. As of 2018, Telex has evolved into refraction networking.

Purpose
Telex complements services like Tor (anonymity network) by placing Telex stations in the network infrastructure of free countries. A client can create a TLS tunnel that is indistinguishable from allowed traffic. That way, firewalls in censored countries are neither able to detect nor to block access to specific parts of the Internet, assuming they allow access at all.

See also 
 Domain fronting

References

External links
Official website

Internet privacy software
Anonymity networks
Secure communication
Internet censorship